Rezina is a district in the east of Moldova, with the administrative center at Rezina. Rezina is situated on the western bank of the Nistru river. As of 1 January 2011, its population was 52,600.

History

The first human settlements on the territory of the district today appeared in the Neolithic era (7th-5th millennium BC). Near villages Solonceni, Echimăuţi and Stohnaia and found traces of the existence of territorial and cultural community of families of related tribes. Fertile soil, suitable for cattle breeding and agriculture, water and forests bank, which is a good shelter, were elements that favored flat settlements in these places. Dacians inhabited these territories 2nd millennium BC - 5th century AD. 1st century BC Dacian leader Burebista, unites dacian communities, forming a unitary Dacian state. This state called Dacia, included the present territory of Rezina district. In the 10th-12th centuries a monastery was built near Tipova. The monastery is carved from a giant limestone rock and includes 18 caves, connected by internal passages. It is one of the most important buildings (cave monastery) on the banks of the Nistru river. District towns, with the earliest historical attestation are Horodiste and Pecişte documented during 1437–1466.
The first evidence of Rezina, a village landlord, we find a document of 5 February 1495 that prince of Stephan the Great, strengthens his Toader, Rezina village where he was Alexa Vataman, at the mouth of Rezina river purchased from his relatives, grandchildren of the great Negrea 70 Tatars zloty. In the 16th-18th centuries, further develop the region's economic, cultural and shows a marked increase in the population. In 1812 Treaty of Bucharest divides Basarabia from the Principality of Moldova, the first being ceded to Russia. In 1918 after the collapse of the Russian Empire, Basarabia decide union with the motherland Romania, during this period (1918–1944) district, is part of Orhei County. Basarabia is again busy this time of the USSR after the Molotov-Ribbentrop Treaty. In 1991 as a result of the proclamation of Independence of Moldova, part of the Soroca County (1991–2003), and in 2003 became administrative unit of Moldova.

Geography

Rezina district is located in the central-eastern part of Moldova. Does neighborhood Şoldăneşti District in the north, to the east with Rîbnița District, in south Orhei District and Teleneşti District in the west. District is located, Nistru Plateau, has a rugged terrain, with a strong erosion process. Throughout the district, situated on the river Nistru, is very picturesque. Of particular interest has two nature reserves: Saharna (670 ha) and Tipova (430 ha). Of rare beauty is Saharna river, forming small 22 waterfalls. Among the most impressive are "Gypsy Falls" with a height of 4 m and 6 m wide. Tipova nature reserve, covers the old terraces of the Nistru River and Tipova river valleys, which flows through the gorge, forming several waterfalls with a height of 10–16 m. District has mineral resources like gravel, sand, clay, stone and raw material for cement.

Climate
District has a warm climate, temperate, climate influenced by the Eastern Carpathians and Ukrainian Plain. The average annual temperature in this area is between 8-9 c degrees, in winter -4-4.5 c, sometimes reaching -20-25 degrees, 35-40 degrees in summer. In the present climate of this area has become warmer than bank last century. The fact is explained, as is known, the evolution of warm climate in Western and Eastern Europe, the temperature change caused by different natural and human factors.

Fauna

Fauna are typical of Central Europe with: fox, badger, raccoon dog, deer, wild boar, red wolf, brown rat, marten, wild cat and others. Birds include: stork, egret, swan, wild duck, seagull, hawk, tits, raven, nightingale, eagle, starling, crow and owl.

Flora
Forests are composed of oak, ash, linden, maple, locust and others.  Herbal vegetation of rocky limestone slopes features: fescue, clover, knotweed, etc.

Rivers

District is located in the Nistru river basin, with its tributaries Saharna and Tipova, which crosses the district. In the district meet the waterfalls, springs and wells.

Administrative subdivisions
Localities: 41
Administrative center: Rezina
Cities: Rezina
Villages: 16
Communes: 24

Demographics
1 January 2012 the district population was 52,300 of which 25.1% urban and 74.9% rural population.

Births (2010): 586 (11.1 per 1000)
Deaths (2010): 729 (13.8 per 1000)
Growth rate (2010): -143 (-2.7 per 1000)

Ethnic groups 

Footnote: * There is an ongoing controversy regarding the ethnic identification of Moldovans and Romanians.

Religion 
Christians - 98.2%
Orthodox Christians - 96.9%
Protestant - 1.3%
Baptists - 0.6%
Seventh-day Adventists - 0.5%
Evangelicals - 0.1%
Pentecostals - 0.1%
Other - 0.8%
No Religion - 1.0%

Economy
In the district are 8264 registered entities, including the right person - 7645 including: individual enterprises - 578, peasant households - 7067, with the right of legal person - 19 (SRL, SA, joint ventures). Share 34 461 ha is agricultural land (55.5%) of the total land surface.

Education
In Rezina district operates 41 educational institutions, including schools - 38 of which: 7 - 3235 students studying in high schools, 5 - middle schools with 2719 pupils, 20 - secondary schools with 2719 pupils, 6 - primary schools with 102 students, 24 preschool -  with 1474 children, 1 - professional schools with 242 students, 1 - auxiliary school with 164 children, 1 - music school with 70 children, 1 - 68 arts school children. Currently in educational institutions in the district operates 924 teachers.

Politics
Rezina is a larger district with this center-right parties. PCRM during the 2001-2009 election had more than 50% of the vote is now in constant decay. District is one of the founding members of Euroregion Dniester.

During the last three elections AEI had an increase of 74.8%

Elections

|-
!style="background-color:#E9E9E9" align=center colspan="2" valign=center|Parties and coalitions
!style="background-color:#E9E9E9" align=right|Votes
!style="background-color:#E9E9E9" align=right|%
!style="background-color:#E9E9E9" align=right|+/−
|-
| 
|align=left|Party of Communists of the Republic of Moldova
|align="right"|9,631
|align="right"|39.40
|align="right"|−9.43
|-
| 
|align=left|Liberal Democratic Party of Moldova
|align="right"|6,797
|align="right"|27.81
|align="right"|+8.57
|-
| 
|align=left|Democratic Party of Moldova
|align="right"|3,588
|align="right"|14,68
|align="right"|+3.24
|-
| 
|align=left|Liberal Party
|align="right"|1,890
|align="right"|7.73
|align="right"|−2.92
|-
|bgcolor=#0033cc|
|align=left|European Action Movement
|align="right"|841
|align="right"|3.44
|align="right"|+3.44
|-
|bgcolor="grey"|
|align=left|United Moldova
|align="right"|304
|align="right"|1.24
|align="right"|+1.24
|-
| 
|align=left|Christian Democratic People's Party
|align="right"|301
|align="right"|1.23
|align="right"|−2.24
|-
| 
|align=left|Party Alliance Our Moldova
|align="right"|265
|align="right"|1.08
|align="right"|−3.89
|-
|bgcolor="grey"|
|align=left|Other Party
|align="right"|834
|align="right"|3.39
|align="right"|+1.99
|-
|align=left style="background-color:#E9E9E9" colspan="2"|Total (turnout 62.03%)
|width="30" align="right" style="background-color:#E9E9E9"|24,625
|width="30" align="right" style="background-color:#E9E9E9"|100.00
|width="30" align="right" style="background-color:#E9E9E9"|

Culture
Works: Museums - 1, Public libraries - 36 homes and houses of culture - 35, Artistic education institutions - 3, Enable artistic - 116, 19 bands which holds the band model, institutions of social assistance are Section Social and Family Protection and nursing "Grandma's House."

Health
In district works: family medical center - one, the hospital district - one, the resort to emergency care - 1, health center - 5, family doctors' offices - 16, medical centers - 11, state pharmacies - 1, 28 pharmaceutical kiosks, private pharmacies - 3 in town and four in villages. In the field of public health, the district operates 63 physicians.

Personalities

 Alexandru Cotruţă - Basarabian politician
 Joseph Rabinowitz - Lawyer, founder of the first Jewish Christian congregation in Russia
 Nicolae Checerul Cuş - Politician, member of the Sfatul Țării (1917–1918)
 Nicolae Josan - Moldovan footballer, currently evolving to Anzhi Makhachkala

References

 
Districts of Moldova